The 2021 Brunei Super League is the seventh season of the Brunei Super League, the top Bruneian professional league for association football clubs, since its establishment in 2012. The season began on 20 June.

On 7 August, the Football Association of Brunei Darussalam (FABD) announced the suspension of the league due to restrictions reimposed by the presence of local COVID-19 infections announced by the Ministry of Health on the same day.

On 30 November, the FABD announced that the league will be abandoned due to the constraints caused by the pandemic, in order to prepare for a new competition to be held the following year.

Teams

Foreign Players

Results

League table

Results

Matchday 1

Matchday 2

Matchday 3

Matchday 4

Matchday 5

Matchday 6

Matchday 7

Matchday 8

Top scorers

References

External links
Football Association of Brunei Darussalam website 

Brunei Super League seasons
Brunei
Association football events curtailed and voided due to the COVID-19 pandemic